Ferroresonance or nonlinear resonance is a type of resonance in electric circuits which occurs when a circuit containing a nonlinear inductance is fed from a source that has series capacitance, and the circuit is subjected to a disturbance such as opening of a switch.  It can cause overvoltages and overcurrents in an electrical power system and can pose a risk to transmission and distribution equipment and to operational personnel.

Ferroresonance is different from linear resonance that occurs when inductive and capacitive reactances of a circuit are equal. In linear resonance the current and voltage are linearly related in a manner that is frequency dependent. In the case of ferroresonance it is characterised by a sudden jump of voltage or current from one stable operating state to another one. The relationship between voltage and current is dependent not only on frequency but also on other factors, such as the system voltage magnitude, initial magnetic flux condition of transformer iron core, the total loss in the ferroresonant circuit, and the point on wave of initial switching.

Ferroresonant effects were first described in a 1907 paper by Joseph Bethenod. The term ferroresonance was apparently coined by French engineer Paul Boucherot in a 1920 paper, in which he analysed the phenomenon of two stable fundamental frequency operating points coexisting in a series circuit containing a resistor, nonlinear inductor and a capacitor.

Conditions 
Ferroresonance can occur when an unloaded 3-phase system consisting mainly of inductive and capacitive components is interrupted by single phase means. In the electrical distribution field this typically occurs on a medium voltage electrical distribution network of transformers (inductive component) and power cables (capacitive component).  If such a network has little or no resistive load connected and one phase of the applied voltage is then interrupted, ferroresonance can occur.  If the remaining phases are not quickly interrupted and the phenomenon continues, overvoltage can lead to the breakdown of insulation in the connected components resulting in their failure.

The phenomenon can be avoided by connecting a minimal resistive load on the transformer secondaries or by interrupting the applied voltage by a 3-phase interrupting device such as a ganged (3-pole) circuit breaker.

See also
 Constant-voltage transformer

References 

Electric power distribution